The 1967 New Zealand bravery awards were announced via a special honours list dated 8 May 1967, and recognised five people for brave conduct and acts of gallantry following an explosion at the Strongman coal mine on 19 January 1967.

British Empire Medal (BEM)
Civil division, for gallantry
 Archibald Auld – of Greymouth
 Wilfred Boardman – of Dunollie
 George William Ewen – of Runanga
 Ronald James Gibb – of Dunollie
 Richard Francis Thomas – of Greymouth

References

Bravery
Bravery awards
New Zealand bravery awards